

Notes
1. The order of the list is decided by 1. year of the Games; 2. Name of sport (alphabetical); 3. Name of event (alphabetical) until Athens 2004. Hopefully I will be able to refresh the list from Beijing 2008.
2. In team events, the order of the members of the certain team is decided by surname of the member (alphabetical).

Sources
Hungarian Olympic Triumph!
 http://www.mob.hu
 http://www.olympic.org

 
Olympics